The 1913 Armory Show contained approximately 1300 works by 300 artists. Many of the original works have been lost and some of the artists have been forgotten. The list of artists in the Armory Show, while not complete, includes nearly all the artists from the United States and Europe who were exhibited in the Armory Show of 1913. The list is largely drawn from the catalog of the 1963 exhibition, 1913 Armory Show 50th Anniversary Exhibition, organized by the Munson-Williams-Proctor Arts Institute. Many exhibitions have been held in the vast spaces of U.S. National Guard armories, but the Armory Show refers to the International Exhibition of Modern Art that was organized by the Association of American Painters and Sculptors and opened in New York City's 69th Regiment Armory, on Lexington Avenue between 25th and 26th Streets, on February 17, 1913, and ran to March 15. It became a legendary watershed event in the history of American art, introducing astonished New Yorkers, accustomed to realistic art, to modern art. The show served as a catalyst for American artists, who became more independent and created their own artistic language.

Artists
These artists are all listed in the 50th anniversary catalog as having exhibited in the original 1913 Armory show.

 Robert Ingersoll Aitken
 Alexander Archipenko
 George Grey Barnard
 Chester Beach
 Gifford Beal
 Maurice Becker
 George Bellows
 Joseph Bernard
 Guy Pène du Bois
 Oscar Bluemner
 Pierre Bonnard
 Gutzon Borglum
 Antoine Bourdelle
 Constantin Brâncuși
 Georges Braque
 Patrick Henry Bruce
 Paul Burlin
 Theodore Earl Butler
 Charles Camoin
 Arthur Carles
 Mary Cassatt
 Oscar Cesare
 Paul Cézanne
 Pierre Puvis de Chavannes
 Camille Corot
 Gustave Courbet
 Henri-Edmond Cross
 Leon Dabo
 Andrew Dasburg
 Honoré Daumier
 Jo Davidson
 Arthur B. Davies
 Stuart Davis
 Edgar Degas
 Eugène Delacroix
 Robert Delaunay
 Maurice Denis
 André Derain
 Marcel Duchamp
 Raoul Dufy
 Jacob Epstein
 Roger de La Fresnaye
 Othon Friesz
 Paul Gauguin
 William Glackens
 Albert Gleizes
 Vincent van Gogh
 Francisco Goya
 Marsden Hartley
 Childe Hassam
 Robert Henri
 Edward Hopper
 Ferdinand Hodler
 Jean Auguste Dominique Ingres
 James Dickson Innes
 Augustus John
 Wassily Kandinsky
 Ernst Ludwig Kirchner
 Leon Kroll
 Walt Kuhn
 Gaston Lachaise
 Marie Laurencin
 Ernest Lawson
 Henri de Toulouse-Lautrec
 Fernand Léger
 Jonas Lie
 George Luks
 Aristide Maillol
 Édouard Manet
 Henri Manguin
 John Marin
 Albert Marquet
 Henri Matisse
 Alfred Henry Maurer
 Kenneth Hayes Miller
 Claude Monet
 Adolphe Monticelli
 Edvard Munch
 Elie Nadelman
 Walter Pach
 Jules Pascin
 Francis Picabia
 Pablo Picasso
 Camille Pissarro
 Maurice Prendergast
 Odilon Redon
 Pierre-Auguste Renoir
 Boardman Robinson
 Theodore Robinson
 Auguste Rodin
 Georges Rouault
 Henri Rousseau
 Morgan Russell
 Albert Pinkham Ryder
 André Dunoyer de Segonzac
 Georges Seurat
 Charles Sheeler
 Walter Sickert
 Paul Signac
 Alfred Sisley
 John Sloan
 Amadeo de Souza Cardoso
 Joseph Stella
 John Henry Twachtman
 Félix Vallotton
 Raymond Duchamp-Villon
 Jacques Villon
 Maurice de Vlaminck
 Édouard Vuillard
 Abraham Walkowitz
 J. Alden Weir
 James Abbott McNeill Whistler
 Jack B. Yeats
 Marguerite Zorach
 William Zorach

More artists

These artists are listed in the 50th anniversary catalog and in The Story of the Armory Show   as having exhibited in the original 1913 Armory show.

 Albert Abendschein
 John H. Alger
 Karl Anderson
 Edmund Marion Ashe
 Florence Howell Barkley
 Wladimir von Bechtejeff
 Marion H. Beckett
 Nelson N. Bickford
 Olaf Bjorkman
 Alexandre Blanchet
 Hans Bolz
 Homer Boss
 Bessie Marsh Brewer
 D. Putnam Brinley
 Bolton Brown
 Fannie Miller Brown
 Edith Woodman Burroughs
 Auguste Chabaud
 Oliver Newberry Chaffee
 Robert Winthrop Chanler
 Émilie Charmy
 Amos Chew
 Alfred Vance Churchill
 Gustave Cimiotti, Jr.
 Edwin S. Clymer
 Harry W. Coate
 Nessa Cohen
 Glenn O. Coleman
 Howard Coluzzi
 Charles Conder
 Kate Cory
 Arthur Crisp
 Herbert Crowley
 J. Frank Currier
 Carl Gordon Cutler
 Randall Davey
 Charles Harold Davis
 Edith Dimock
 Rudolph Dirks
 Nathaniel Dolinsky
 Gaines Ruger Donoho
 Henri-Lucien Doucet
 Katherine S. Dreier
 Aileen King Dresser
 Lawrence Tyler Dresser
 Florence Dreyfous
 Richard H. Duffy
 Georges Dufrénoy
 Abastenia St. Leger Eberle
 Henry B. Eddy 
 Amos W. Engle
 Florence Esté 
 Lily Abbott Everett
 Jules Flandrin
 Mary Foote
 James Earle Fraser
 Kenneth Frazier
 Arthur Ernest Freund
 Sherry E. Fry
 Ernest Fuhr
 Samuel Wood Gaylor
 Phelan Gibb
 Wilhelm Gimmi
 Pierre Girieud
 Henry J. Glintenkamp
 Anne Goldthwaite
 Charles Guérin
 Bernard Gussow
 Bernhard Gutmann
 Philip Leslie Hale
 Samuel Halpert
 Charles R. Harley
 Edith Haworth
 Walter Helbig
 Julius Hess
 Eugene Higgins
 Margaret Hoard
 Nathaniel Hone
 Charles Hopkinson
 Cecil de Blaquiere Howard
 Albert Humphreys
 Mrs. Thomas Hunt
 Margaret Wendell Huntington
 Franz M. Jansen
 Gwen John
 Grace Mott Johnson
 Julius Paul Junghanns
 Bernard Karfiol
 Henry Keller
 Edith L. King
 Alfred Kirstein
 Adolph Kleiminger
 Hermine E. Kleinert
 Edward Adam Kramer
 Pierre Laprade
 Arthur Lee
 Derwent Lees
 Wilhelm Lehmbruck
 Rudolf Levy
 Amy Londoner
 August Frederick Lundberg
 Dodge MacKnight
 Elmer Livingston MacRae
 Gus Mager
 Edward Middleton Manigault
 Matthijs Maris
 Manuel Martinez Hugué
 Jacqueline Marval
 Carolyn Mase
 Max Mayrshofer
 Francis McComas
 Kathleen McEnery
 Howard McLean
 Charlotte Meltzer
 Oscar Miestchanioff
 David Brown Milne
 John Frederick Mowbray-Clarke
 Henry Muhrman
 Hermann Dudley Murphy
 Myra Musselmann-Carr
 Ethel Myers
 Jerome Myers
 Frank Arthur Nankivell
 Helen J. Niles
 Olga Oppenheimer
 Marjorie Organ
 Josephine Paddock
 Agnes Lawrence Pelton
 Charles H. Pepper
 Van Dearing Perrine
 Harriet Sophia Phillips
 Anastasio Pietro
 Walter K. Pleuthner
 Louise Pope
 Louis Potter
 Thomas E. Powers
 James Moore Preston
 May Wilson Preston
 James Pryde
 Arthur Putnam
 Bertrand Rasmussen
 Henry Reuterdahl
 Katharine Rhoades
 Dr. William Rimmer
 Mary Rogers
 Paul Rohland
 Jules Edouard Roiné
 Edward F. Rook
 Ker-Xavier Roussel
 Charles Cary Rumsey
 George W. Russell
 Victor D. Salvatore
 Morton L. Schamberg
 William E. Schumacher
 Charles-Emmanuel Serret
 Julius Seyler
 Charles Shannon
 Sidney Dale Shaw
 Max Slevogt
 Carl Sprinchorn
 Wilson Steer
 Frances Simpson Stevens
 Morgan Stinemetz
 Nicolai A. Tarchov
 Henry Fitch Taylor
 William L. Taylor
 Felix E. Tobeen
 Gaston Toussaint
 Allen Tucker
 J. Alden Twachtman
 Bessie Potter Vonnoh
 F. M. Walts
 Hilda Ward
 Alexander L. Warshawsky
 F. William Weber
 E. Ambrose Webster
 Friedrich August Weinzheimer
 Albert Weisgerber
 Julius Wentscher, Jr.
 Charles Henry White
 Claggett Wilson
 Denys Wortman
 Enid Yandell
 Arthur Young
 Mahonri Young
 Eugène Zak

Notes

See also
 List of women artists in the Armory Show

References

External links

 Smithsonian, Archives of American Art, Walt Kuhn scrapbook of press clippings documenting the Armory Show, vol. 2, 1913. Armory Show catalogue (illustrated) from pages 159 through 236
 Catalogue of international exhibition of modern art Association of American Painters and Sculptors. Published 1913 by the Association in New York
 Partial list of artists in the 1913 Armory Show, askart

1913 in New York City
1913 in New York (state)
. Armory Show
Art exhibitions in the United States
Culture of New York City
Cultural history of the United States
Lists of American artists
Lists of artists
Manhattan-related lists
Modern artists